The Rythe is a river or stream in north Surrey, England which is generally open and which is a natural woodland feature for approximately half of its course before being variously culverted and a suburban garden feature, passing between Thames Ditton and Long Ditton, then discharging into the Thames. Its longest branch is the Arbrook which drains Arbrook Common, a woodland of the mainly wooded Esher Commons.

Course
The Rythe or Wrythe rises at several sources, the furthest being four sources in Prince's Coverts (woodland), all in the parish and ward of Oxshott where on its northern edge it combines to form the Arbrook.

It runs under the six-lane A3 into wooded Arbrook Common there joined by three further headwaters rising in the suburban village of Claygate, immediately to the east (right bank). It carries on north bounding Littleworth Common and Hinchley Wood to the Scilly Isles roundabout at part of a remnant of the wooded Ditton Marsh, now part of Esher.  It then follows the Portsmouth Road east through part of Thames Ditton and alongside the South West Main Line.  It receives its shorter east branch (rising in Surbiton Golf Course, Long Ditton) then turns running into the Thames near Ferry Road, 800 metres north.

The Rythe has many clay banks and its lack of depth and width at pinch points has been implicated in flash flooding in gardens and drainage systems, particularly for its mid-course headwaters in Claygate. A flood alleviation scheme was therefore drawn up in 2002 between flood alleviation authorities. Some of its course is owned by landowners.  It discharges into the Thames dividing Thames Ditton from Long Ditton to the east on the reach above Teddington Lock on the north-western border of the county of Surrey with the edge of the administrative county of London.  Its lowest section lies in Thames Ditton.

Water quality
The Environment Agency measures the water quality of the river systems in England. Each is given an overall ecological status, which may be one of five levels: high, good, moderate, poor and bad. There are several components that are used to determine this, including biological status, which looks at the quantity and varieties of invertebrates, angiosperms and fish. Chemical status, which compares the concentrations of various chemicals against known safe concentrations, is rated good or fail.

Water quality of the Rythe in 2019:

See also
Tributaries of the River Thames
List of rivers of England

References

External links

Rythe
1Rythe